Boys Life was a band from Malden, Massachusetts. Band members included John Surette, Joe McCormack, Robert Weiner, Chris George, Ed Weston and Neal Sugarman.  The band's name was based on Boys' Life magazine.

The band existed from 1979 to 1985. They have a short discography.

References

External links 
 David Surrette on the origin of Boys Life
Boston Rock Archive entry for Boys Life

Musical groups from Massachusetts